Eurata paraguayensis is a moth of the subfamily Arctiinae. It was described by Schrottky in 1910. It is found in Paraguay.

References

 Natural History Museum Lepidoptera generic names catalog

Arctiinae
Moths described in 1910